Venelin Kadankov (born ) is a Bulgarian male volleyball player. He is part of the Bulgaria men's national volleyball team. On club level he plays for Afyonkarahisar Genclik.

References

External links
 profile at FIVB.org

1987 births
Living people
Bulgarian men's volleyball players
Place of birth missing (living people)